Crosse's shrew (Crocidura crossei) is a species of mammal in the family Soricidae. It is found in Benin, Cameroon, Ivory Coast, Ghana, Guinea, Liberia, Nigeria, Sierra Leone, and Togo. Its natural habitat is subtropical or tropical moist lowland forests.

References

Crosse's shrew
Mammals of West Africa
Crosse's shrew
Crosse's shrew
Taxonomy articles created by Polbot